Killadi is a 2015 Indian Tamil-language action comedy film directed by A. Venkatesh, and produced by Salem Chandrasekharan. It stars Bharath and Nila, while Vivek and Roja play pivotal roles. The music was composed by Srikanth Deva. After beginning production in 2006, the film went through production troubles before releasing on 30 January 2015.

Cast 

 Bharath as Dharani
 Nila as Anjali
 Vivek as Arnold
 Roja as Angayarkanni
 Vincent Asokan as Bhavani
 Avinash as SP Easwarapandiyan
 Vennira Aadai Moorthy as Dharmarajan
 Ilavarasu as Inspector Britto
 Delhi Ganesh as Dharani's father
 Cell Murugan as Rambo
 O. A. K. Sundar as Police officer
 Amarasigamani as Anjali's father
 Prem as Dharani's brother
 Bayilvan Ranganathan as Traffic police
 Rajyalakshmi as Dharani's mother
 Vanaja as Easwari, Dharani's sister-in-law
 Revathi Priya as Lakshmi, Dharani's sister
 Sindhu as Servant
 Chelladurai as Head constable
 Kili Ramachandran as Gas company worker
 Thenali as Drunkard
 Japan Kumar as Dharani's friend
 Venkat as Easwarapandiyan's friend
 Supergood Subramani as Chettiar
 Shamili Sukumar as Priya, Anjali's friend
 Archana Harish as Anjali's friend
 Suja Varunee in a special appearance
 Kanal Kannan as Rowdy

Production 
The project was first announced in September 2006, when Salem Chandrasekharan announced that he had signed Bharath and director Venkatesh to work together in a film titled Killadi. In a press meet, the producer noted that the film would proceed simultaneously alongside his other production, Vetrimaaran's Desiya Nendunchalai 47 starring Dhanush. Bharath began shooting the film alongside Koodal Nagar and Nepali, delaying his schedules for the other films to maintain his look for Killadi. However, in 2007, the producer ran into financial problems and postponed his two projects indefinitely.

In December 2009, the producer announced that the film would continue its shoot but it was held back by the director's involvement in other films, Maanja Velu, Vaada and Vallakottai, prompting further delays. The film only picked up again in 2013 and was readied for release, with an extended separate comedy track featuring Vivek and Cell Murugan inserted and extensively shot. Further promotions were advertised by the team throughout 2014, before the film was released in January 2015.

Soundtrack 

The soundtrack is composed by Srikanth Deva collaborating with director Venkatesh for third time, and lyrics written by Vaali. The audio launch of the film took place on 24 March 2013 at Prasad Labs in Chennai. The film's success in overcoming several legal hurdles saw a team of advocates being invited to the event, with the chief guests being producers Kaliaperumal and Gnanavel Raja.

"Sakkapodu" – Ranjith
"Ekka Chakka" – Jithin, Vicky
"Ekka Chakka" (female) – Surmukhi Raman
"Mamavai" – Rita, Mukesh
"Nee Rangikkari" – Velmurugan, Mahathi

Reception 
The film was released on 30 January 2015 to negative reviews. Critic from Times of India noted that: "The film is essentially a compendium of the masala movie must-haves — hero introduction song, aggressive hero, his loving family members, damsel-in-distress heroine, kuthu songs disguised as duets, random comedy track and over-the-top villains".

References

External links 
 

2015 films
2010s Tamil-language films
2015 masala films
Films set in Tiruchirappalli
Films shot in Tiruchirappalli
Films scored by Srikanth Deva
Films directed by A. Venkatesh (director)